Between the Lines is an album by the Japanese R&B duo Chemistry, released on June 18, 2003 by Sony Music Japan.

Track listing
 "Naturally Ours"
 "It Takes Two (OCTOPUSSY Remix feat.LISA)"
 "Point of No Return (ケツメイシのremix)"
 "恋するカレン"
 "BACK TOGETHER AGAIN (West Indies Dream MIX)"
 "Running Away (Spanish Passion)"
 "B.M.N. (BIG MAN NOW)"
 "PIECES OF A DREAM (DJ WATARAI Remix)"
 "You Go Your Way (LOONY TUNE Remix)"
 "MOVE ON (Album Version)"
 "君をさがしてた～シーモネーター&DJ TAKI-SHIT Remix feat.CRYSTAL BOY (nobody knows)"
 "明治チェルシーの唄"
 "最後の夜"

External links
 Official Site: Track downloads

Chemistry (band) albums
2003 albums